Charles Joseph McIlvaine Sr. (August 6, 1903 – January 30, 1975) was an American rower who won a gold medal in the double sculls at the 1928 Olympics, together with Paul Costello. His son, Charles McIlvaine Jr., also became a competitive rower and won a gold medal at the 1955 Pan-American Games.

References

External links
 

1903 births
1975 deaths
Rowers at the 1928 Summer Olympics
Olympic gold medalists for the United States in rowing
American male rowers
Rowers from Philadelphia
Medalists at the 1928 Summer Olympics
Pan American Games medalists in rowing
Pan American Games gold medalists for the United States
Rowers at the 1955 Pan American Games
Medalists at the 1955 Pan American Games